Bharat, or Bharath, may refer to:
 Bharat (term), the name for India in  various Indian languages
 Bharata Khanda, the Sanskrit name for the Indian subcontinent (or South Asia)
 Bharata, the name of several legendary figures or groups:
 Bharata (Mahabharata), a legendary king
 Bharata (Ramayana), a Hindu deity
 Bharata Chakravartin, a figure in Jain mythology
 Bharata (disambiguation), other entities with the name
 Bharat (given name), a contemporary given name (including a list of people with the name)
 Bharat (film), a 2019 Indian Hindi-language drama by Ali Abbas Zafar
 Bharat Biotech, an Indian biotechnology company
 Bharat Electronics, an Indian aerospace and defence company
 Bharat FC, a former Indian professional football team
 Bharat Petroleum, an Indian oil and gas company
 Bharat stage emission standards, a set of Indian emissions standards
 Barat, Bannu, also Bharat, a village in Khyber Pakhtunkhwa, Pakistan
 Bharath (actor) (born 1983), Indian film actor
 Bharath University, in Chennai, India

See also
 
 Barat (disambiguation)
 Bharati (disambiguation)
 Bharata (disambiguation)